Mocuellus is a genus of true bugs belonging to the family Cicadellidae.

The species of this genus are found in Europe, Central Asia and Northern America.

Species:
 Mocuellus aniarus Emeljanov, 1964
 Mocuellus caprillus <small>

References

Cicadellidae
Hemiptera genera